The .300 Lapua Magnum (7.62×70mm) is a specialized rimless bottlenecked centerfire cartridge developed for long-range rifles. The commercially successful .338 Lapua Magnum cartridge has functioned as the parent case for the .300 Lapua Magnum, which is essentially a necked-down version of the .338 Lapua Magnum. The .338 cartridge case was used for this since it has the capability to operate with high chamber pressures which, combined with smaller and hence lighter bullets result in very high muzzle velocities.

History
The Finnish ammunition manufacturer Lapua got the .300 Lapua Magnum C.I.P. (Commission Internationale Permanente pour l'Epreuve des Armes à Feu Portatives) certified, so it became an officially registered and sanctioned member of the Finnish 70 mm "family" of super magnum rifle cartridges. The .300 Lapua Magnum is not commercially available anymore today and currently (2007) exists only as a C.I.P. datasheet. It is however still used by a few shooters who produce the cases from .338 Lapua Magnum brass by reshaping the shoulder and neck, and handloading it with .30 caliber bullets.

Cartridge dimensions
The .300 Lapua Magnum has 7.34 ml (113 grains H2O) cartridge case capacity. The exterior shape of the Lapua Magnum case was designed to promote reliable case feeding and extraction in bolt-action rifles, semi-automatic and automatic firearms alike, under extreme conditions.

.300 Lapua Magnum maximum C.I.P. cartridge dimensions. All sizes in millimeters (mm).

Americans would define the shoulder angle at alpha/2 ≈ 25 degrees. The common rifling twist rate for this cartridge is 240 mm (1 in 9.45 in), 4 grooves, Ø lands = 7.62 mm, Ø grooves = 7.82 mm, land width = 4.47 mm and the primer type is large rifle magnum.

According to the official C.I.P. (Commission Internationale Permanente pour l'Epreuve des Armes à Feu Portatives) rulings the .300 Lapua Magnum can handle up to  Pmax piezo pressure. This now prevails over the C.I.P. decisions and tables edition 2007, that rated the .300 Lapua Magnum at  Pmax piezo pressure. In C.I.P. regulated countries every rifle cartridge combo has to be proofed at 125% of this maximum C.I.P. pressure to certify for sale to consumers.
This means that .300 Lapua Magnum chambered arms in C.I.P. regulated countries are currently (2013) proof tested at  PE piezo pressure.

The .300 Lapua Magnum has a very high maximum allowed chamber pressure level and indicates that the cases of the .300 and .338 Lapua Magnum are built extremely sturdy. The large boltface combined with the high 440 MPa maximum pressure makes that the .300 Lapua Magnum should only be chambered in rifles that are capable of handling such large and fierce cartridges and thus high bolt thrust safely. Chambering such powerful super magnum cartridges in rifles intended for normal magnum rifle cartridges and using Pmax loads can cause serious or fatal injury to the shooter and bystanders. A bolt-action rifle that theoretically could safely be chambered for the 94.5 mm long .300 Lapua Magnum is the Sako TRG-42. This rifle was specially designed for .338 Lapua Magnum cartridges and can handle cartridges up to 95 mm overall length.

Additional information
The .300 Lapua Magnum’s main appeal is long-range shooting. Due to the large case capacity in relation to the 7.62 mm (.308 inch) caliber bore size the .300 Lapua Magnum is very harsh on barrels. The overbore .300 Lapua Magnum typically wears out a rifle barrel in 1000 to 1500 rounds. A lot of thorough barrel cleaning (after every 5 to 10 shots) and carefully avoiding long strings of shots can help to minimize barrel wear. This makes this cartridge impractical for most competition and professional long-range shooters, like military snipers, who tend to fire many rounds in practice to acquire and maintain expert long-range marksmanship.

The Lapua/VihtaVuori international reloading guide 2008 reveals that at 690 mm (27.165 in) barrel length the .300 Lapua Magnum loaded with heavy .30 caliber bullets yields less muzzle energy compared to its .338 Lapua Magnum parent cartridge.

The American .30-378 Weatherby Magnum cartridge introduced in 1996 and the American .300 Remington Ultra Magnum (.300 RUM) cartridge introduced in 1999 are probably the closest currently (2007) commercially available ballistic twins of the .300 Lapua Magnum. The .30-378 Weatherby Magnum is however a belted cartridge and the .300 Remington Ultra Magnum is a rebated rim cartridge.

See also
 List of rifle cartridges
 7 mm caliber
 7.62 UKM
 .338 Lapua Magnum

References

 Cartridge Dimensions - 
 .300 Lapua Magnum cartridge dimensions at Steves Pages
 C.I.P. CD-ROM edition 2003
 C.I.P. decisions, texts and tables (free current C.I.P. CD-ROM version download (ZIP and RAR format))

External links 
 Reloading data for the .300 Lapua Magnum cartridge
 QuickLOAD internal ballistics predictor computer program for fire arms
 VihtaVuori Reloading Guide, 2002
 Lutz Möller's .300 Lapua Magnum Page with a computer made image of the cartridge - SOME LOAD SUGGESTIONS EXCEED THE C.I.P. LIMIT (4700 bar)
 C.I.P. TDCC sheet 300 Lapua Mag.

Pistol and rifle cartridges
Magnum rifle cartridges
Nammo Lapua cartridges